Tottington is a town in the Metropolitan Borough of Bury, Greater Manchester, England, and the area also includes the villages of Walshaw and Greenmount and the surrounding countryside.  The area is unparished, and contains 33 listed buildings that are recorded in the National Heritage List for England.  Of these, two are listed at Grade II*, the middle grade, and the others are at Grade II, the lowest grade.  The area is partly agricultural and partly residential, and its listed buildings include farmhouses and farm buildings, private houses and associated structures, an ancient cross, churches and associated structures, a village lock-up, and schools.


Key

Buildings

References

Citations

Sources

Lists of listed buildings in Greater Manchester
Buildings and structures in the Metropolitan Borough of Bury